Charley Joseph Edge (born 14 May 1997) is a Welsh footballer who plays as a winger for Cymru Premier club Aberystwyth Town.

Edge joined the Colchester United Academy from Everton in 2015 after completing his two-year scholarship. He had previously been on the books of Swansea City and Stoke City. He has also represented Maldon & Tiptree on loan from Colchester, prior to making his professional debut in February 2017. He joined Leamington on loan in September 2017, and Needham Market in March 2018. He was released by Colchester at the end of the 2017–18 season.

Club career
Born in Aberystwyth, Welsh youth international Edge was with Swansea City and Stoke City before moving to Everton for his scholarship in 2013. Joining in June 2013, he completed his two-year scholarship with Everton, before moving on to Colchester United's Academy in August 2015, where he signed a one-year professional development contract. He signed a one-year contract extension in May 2016.

Edge joined Isthmian League Division One North side Maldon & Tiptree for an initial one-month loan on 20 November 2015. He scored a brace on his debut in a 3–0 win against Soham Town Rangers on 21 November, going on to score five goals in eight league appearances.

On 14 February 2017, Edge made his professional debut for Colchester as an 84th-minute substitute in their 3–2 home defeat by Crawley Town.

On 3 July 2017, Edge signed a new one-year contract with Colchester United.

On 9 September 2017, Edge moved on loan to National League North side Leamington for one month. He made his debut the same day in Leamington's 0–0 draw at Darlington. He made two league appearances.

On 16 March 2018, Isthmian League Premier Division side Needham Market signed Edge on loan until the end of the season. He made his debut on 21 March in a 1–0 win at Leatherhead.

On 18 May 2018, Colchester announced Edge was one of seven under-23 players being released at the end of their contracts.

International career
Edge has represented Wales at under-16 and under-17 levels. He scored for the under-17s in a 3–1 friendly win against Czech Republic in February 2014. He played in two games of the 2014 elite round qualification for the 2014 UEFA European Under-17 Championship in March 2014, where he played one minute against Switzerland in a 1–0 defeat, and 76-minutes of a 1–0 defeat to Spain two days later.

Personal life
Edge attended The Marches School in Oswestry, where he grew up.

Career statistics

References

External links

1997 births
Living people
Footballers from Aberystwyth
Welsh footballers
Association football wingers
Wales youth international footballers
Swansea City A.F.C. players
Stoke City F.C. players
Everton F.C. players
Colchester United F.C. players
Maldon & Tiptree F.C. players
Leamington F.C. players
Needham Market F.C. players
Isthmian League players
English Football League players
National League (English football) players
Cefn Druids A.F.C. players
Cymru Premier players